In applied mathematics, Wahba's problem, first posed by Grace Wahba in 1965, seeks to find a rotation matrix (special orthogonal matrix) between two coordinate systems from a set of (weighted) vector observations. Solutions to Wahba's problem are often used in satellite attitude determination utilising sensors such as magnetometers and multi-antenna GPS receivers. The cost function that Wahba's problem seeks to minimise is as follows:

  for 

 is an optional set of weights for each observation.

A number of solutions to the problem have appeared in literature, notably Davenport's q-method, QUEST and methods based on the singular value decomposition (SVD). Several methods for solving Wahba's problem are discussed by Markley and Mortari.

This is an alternative formulation of the Orthogonal Procrustes problem (consider all the vectors multiplied by the square-roots of the corresponding weights as columns of two matrices with N columns to obtain the alternative formulation). An elegant derivation of the solution on one and a half page can be found in.

Solution via SVD 

One solution can be found using a singular value decomposition (SVD).

1. Obtain a matrix  as follows:

2. Find the singular value decomposition of 

3. The rotation matrix is simply:

where

Notes

References 
 Wahba, G. Problem 65–1: A Least Squares Estimate of Satellite Attitude, SIAM Review, 1965, 7(3), 409
 Shuster, M. D. and Oh, S. D. Three-Axis Attitude Determination from Vector Observations, Journal of Guidance and Control, 1981, 4(1):70–77
 Markley, F. L. Attitude Determination using Vector Observations and the Singular Value Decomposition, Journal of the Astronautical Sciences, 1988, 38:245–258
 Markley, F. L. and Mortari, D. Quaternion Attitude Estimation Using Vector Observations, Journal of the Astronautical Sciences, 2000, 48(2):359–380
 Markley, F. L. and Crassidis, J. L. Fundamentals of Spacecraft Attitude Determination and Control, Springer 2014
 Libbus, B. and Simons, G. and Yao, Y. Rotating Multiple Sets of Labeled Points to Bring Them Into Close Coincidence: A Generalized Wahba Problem, The American Mathematical Monthly, 2017, 124(2):149–160
Lourakis, M. and Terzakis, G. Efficient Absolute Orientation Revisited, IEEE/RSJ International Conference on Intelligent Robots and Systems (IROS), 2018, pp. 5813-5818.

See also 
 Triad method
 Kabsch algorithm
 Orthogonal Procrustes problem

Applied mathematics